Bieżyce  is a village in the administrative district of Gmina Gubin, within Krosno Odrzańskie County, Lubusz Voivodeship, in western Poland, close to the German border.

Notable residents
 Günther Konopacki (10 October 1921 – 23 June 1987), wehrmacht officer

References

Villages in Krosno Odrzańskie County